This is a list of Bangladeshi films that was released in 2014 in Bangladesh or overseas. A few of the movies are joint ventures.

January–March

April–June

July–September

October–December

See also

 List of Bangladeshi films
 Dhallywood
 Cinema of Bangladesh

References

Film
Bangladesh
 2014